Lymore, or Lymore House or Lodge was demolished in 1931. It stood in Lymore Park, one mile ESE of Montgomery, Powys, Wales. The house was a large half-timbered house built by Edward Herbert, 3rd Baron Herbert of Chirbury, c. 1675, to replace the family residences  in Montgomery Castle and Black Hall in Montgomery. The house, which had been uninhabited but maintained  for many years, was used for an event in 1921, when one of the floors collapsed with disastrous consequences, resulting in  demolition in 1931. The Earls of Powis still own and maintain the park. The park includes the grounds of the Montgomery Cricket Club, which is the oldest cricket pitch in Montgomeryshire and Offa's Dyke forms its eastern boundary. It is listed on the Cadw/ICOMOS Register of Parks and Gardens of Special Historic Interest in Wales.

General description
Today, the site of Lymore Hall is overgrown, with the walled garden filled with trees. On the north side, the Gardeners Cottages, shown on a survey of 1775, still stands. On the West side stands the Lymore Farmhouse (the former  Steward's or Bailiff's House) which was originally attached to the main house. It incorporates much early brick. On the West, the site is partly encircled by three large ornamental lakes, probably late 17th century, though the Middle Pool, traversed by a causeway is now dry. Opposite, on the Middle Pool are the stone walls of a curious ‘fortified’ farmyard (either a folly, or for militia training) and a Georgian brick farmhouse.  There was also a mill building (later converted to a water driven sawmill),  which was part of the ornamental setting  (cf Mill at Dunham Massey, Cheshire) with gardens on the East side. Elsewhere, more elements of the hunting  park layout can be observed, with fox coverts and decoy ponds with a hut in wood to South and another possible decoy pond in Bronyhall wood. Throughout the parkland there are numerous old oaks. The tree ring-evidence from a recently felled example suggests that they were planted in the late 17th century. A letter from Lord Herbert of Chirbury in 1673 mentions that he intended to sow the frith with nuts and acorns for a perpetual stock of fuel

The Montgomery Cricket Club
The cricket pitch is to the North East of the house. The earliest recorded match on the Lymore pitch was on 17 September 1847 between eleven gentlemen of Montgomery and eleven of Newtown.  After this the club became established and in 1882 a match was played between A United All England Eleven versus 22 of Montgomery. The Montgomery team won by 62 runs in a two-innings match. In the 1970s the original wooden pavilion was replaced by the present brick pavilion.

History

The park before Lymore was built
The earliest features, revealed by excavation and aerial photography, are the  medieval causeway on the North side of the park, which continues to the Hollow Way going to the Rhydywiman ford in the river Severn, which would have linked with the Trystllywelyn causeway on the other side of the Severn. This would have been a major routeway into Wales before the foundation of  the town of Montgomery. A slightly later feature is a possible Deserted Medieval Village, which may have been a vill of Chirbury Priory, with a large area of ridge and furrow cultivation. The creation of the Park at Lymore, would have taken place after the Herberts acquired the lands of Chirbury Priory in the late 16th century

Building history

The house was a large and late half-timbered house built  by Edward, third Lord Herbert of Cherbury, c. 1675 (date on a gable finial but not finished until 1677, a year before Lord Herbert's death) to replace the New Building in the outer bailey of Montgomery, and possibly his other house  Plas Llysen or Llysun, which was set in his other Montgomeryshire park at Llanerfyl. The house had a close-studded frontage, with an open three-bay loggia on the ground floor, six gables, and, rising from the centre, a pyramid-roofed look-out tower. This lookout tower can be compared with  the stair-turret lookout at Plas Mawr, Conwy and a very similar tower on Oak House West Bromwich.

A series of letters between Edward Herbert  and his agent Roger Jones provides a fairly detailed outline of the building work that was taking place. In the first letter Lord Herbert of Cherbury is undecided whether to re-build at Black Hall, below the Castle at Montgomery or at Lymore. He, however, decides to have 300,000 bricks fired at the estate brickyard (this would have been at the Stalloe brickyard to the North East of Montgomery).  He then acquires more land at Lymore and proceeds with demolishing "Powell's" house to use for timber for Lymore. There is then a detailed account of the construction work and particularly alterations to the staircase. It has been speculated that the staircase, which, in 1931, was removed to Aldborough Hall in Yorkshire, came from the  New Build, in Montgomery Castle, but this is unsubstantiated. Although Lymore is thought primarily as being a timber framed house, a huge quantity of bricks were used in the extensive kitchen and service wing that lay to the south. This was pulled down after 1795. Early bricks were also used in the walled garden and the Steward's house which was reconstructed in 1931.
The earliest drawing of Lymore is dated July 1684, when it was sketched by Thomas Dineley, who was accompanying the Duke of Beaufort on his progress through Wales. The north frontage of the house was shown with six gables. A survey of the valuation of Lands belonging to the Earls of Powis in 1785 shows the house with eight gables. The house was drawn  by Moses Griffiths for Thomas Pennant in 1775, during his tour of Montgomeryshire and Shropshire. Thomas Pennant intended to re-publish this tour and in 1794–5 he commissioned three further watercolours of Lymore from John Ingleby, which are now in a collection in the National Library of Wales. These watercolours add greatly to our knowledge of Lymore and particularly for details of the brick service range to the south of the timber framed reception areas of Lymore Hall. An extensive reconstruction of Lymore must have taken place in the early years of the 19th century, when the number of gables on the north frontage were reduced to three.

Illustrations by John Ingleby of Lymore 1794/5

Later history and demolition in 1931
Lymore was only lived in for one year by Edward Herbert, 3rd Baron Herbert of Chirbury, and he was succeeded by Henry, the 4th Baron, who died in 1691. His widow Lady Catherine continued to live at Lymore until her death in 1714, when the house and estate devolved to Francis Herbert of Dolguog at Penegoes in Montgomeryshire.

In 1903 Fletcher Moss in his Pilgrimages to Old Homes, mostly on the Welsh Borders gives a graphic account of being shown round the deserted house by the daughter of the caretaker.  He recounts cycling up to the hall amid a herd of grand Herefords, some of which looked like weighing a ton, and by a picturesque saw-mill  where great trunks of trees are piled up. He remarks that the oak in this house is wonderful. All the floors in the house are waxed and polished, but the panelling, doors and other oaken work is simply dusted. He noted that the house was well kept, some of the old furniture was still there, and that fires were lit during the winter to keep the house warm. Lady Powis had had a picnic tea there the previous day and Lord Kitchener was shortly to come for a shoot. In 1907 the house was recorded in Country Life and in 1909, the future King George V came to Lymore as the guest of the 4th Earl of Powis for a shooting party.

The end of Lymore was heralded in August 1921, when the floor of the Banqueting Hall dramatically collapsed in the course of a church bazaar. This was graphically described at great length in the Montgomeryshire Express and Radnor Times of Tuesday 9 August 1921. It was reported that there was a considerable congestion of people near the main entrance … suddenly without any audible promontory symptoms, a knot of guest were observed to disappear outright.  17 people had disappeared, nearly 12 feet below, into a stone vault. The Earl of Powis was at the time talking to the Rector of Montgomery, and he disappeared with the lady journalist from the Montgomeryshire County Times, while the Rector remained above. Fortunately, no-one was badly injured although some people were badly shaken.
 
In 1929 the Earl of Powis decided that he could no longer afford the cost of maintenance and offered the house through the Office of Works to the nation. The Earl also offered the house to anyone for £1 to anyone who would put it in order.  The house was then surveyed by  the architect A B Waters  and his report in the Montgomeryshire Collections provides detailed plans and elevations of the house, as it stood.  The furnishings and fittings of the House were then offered for sale at an auction on 25 October 1929 by the Estate department of Harrods. A last minute offer of £10,000 was made by the National Trust through the Office of Works to preserve the house for the Nation, but the Office of Works did not consider that this was a sufficient sum for the repair work, so the sale went ahead. This was followed on 20 May 1931 by a sale of the structural elements of the house.  A fine carved staircase with diamond-rusticated newels had already been removed to Aldborough Hall, Ripon, Yorkshire. Much of the other timber was purchased by Kenneth Hutchinson-Smith, an  architect/builder from Wolverhampton, where it was used for building mock, Tudor houses.

The gardens and pools
On the West the site is partly encircled by three large ornamental lakes, probably late 17th century, though the Middle Pool, traversed by a causeway is now dry. Opposite, on the Middle Pool are the stone walls of a curious ‘fortified’ farmyard (is this a folly or was it for training the militia?) and a Georgian brick farmhouse. The gardens and park are listed at Grade II on the Cadw/ICOMOS Register of Parks and Gardens of Special Historic Interest in Wales.

Literature
 Arnold C J & Reilly P (1986) Archaeological Investigations at Lymore Park, Montgomery  Collections, vol. 74, 73-78
 Cadw (1999) Register of Landscapes, Parks and Gardens of Special Historic Interest in Wales: Powys. Cardiff 
 Country Life Magazine  7 March 1908, Main Feature on Lymore in Montgomeryshire, The Seat of the Earl of Powis.
 Dineley  T.  (Intro. R W Banks), (1888), The Account of the Official Progress of his Grace Henry...Duke of Beaufort (Lord President of the Council in Wales and Lord Warden of the Marches) through Wales in 1684 Blades, East and Blades, London.     
 Higham  R & Barker P (2000) Hen Domen, final Report, Exeter Univ Press, 151–157, especially fig 6.9
 Lloyd, T.,(1986) The Lost Houses of Wales, p.  p 41.
 Moss, Fletcher (1903) Pilgrimages To Old Homes, Mostly On The Welsh Border, self published, pp 247 - 257
 Musson C, (2011) Montgomeryshire Past and Present from the Air, The Powysland Club, 27, Col. Plate
 Pryce T E (1885), Montgomeryshire Collections, vol 18, pp 155–168. 
 Smith J., (1968) Herbert Correspondence, Board of Celtic Studies, UWP 
 Scourfield R and Haslam R, (2013) Buildings of Wales: Powys; Montgomeryshire, Radnorshire and Breconshire, 2nd edition, Yale University Press, p.  133–134.
 Peter Smith,(1988) Houses of the Welsh Countryside, Royal Commission on the Ancient and Historical Monuments of Wales, 2nd edition.
 Ann and John Welton (2003), The Story of Montgomery Logaston Press, 2nd revised edition 2010

See also
Powis Castle
Aberbechan Hall
The Old Bell Museum, Montgomery, Powys.

References

Lymore Gallery

Forests and woodlands of Powys
Timber-framed houses in Wales
Former houses in Wales
Buildings and structures in Powys
Houses in Powys
Montgomery, Powys
Registered historic parks and gardens in Powys